Pseudohemihyalea klagesi is a moth in the family Erebidae. It was described by Walter Rothschild in 1909. It is found in Brazil.

References

klagesi
Moths of South America
Arctiinae of South America
Taxa named by Walter Rothschild
Moths described in 1909